Bud Shank – Shorty Rogers – Bill Perkins  is a Quintet album led by Bud Shank  featuring Shorty Rogers or Bill Perkins which was recorded in 1954 and 1955 for the Pacific Jazz label.

Reception

AllMusic rated the album with three stars.

Track listing
All compositions by Shorty Rogers, except as indicated
 "Shank's Pranks" - 3:12
 "Casa de Luz" - 5:33
 "Lotus Bud" - 3:21
 "Left Bank" - 3:20
 "Jasmine" - 4:08
 "Just a Few" - 4:11
 "Paradise" (Clifford Brown) - 3:03
 "Fluted Columns" (Bud Shank) - 4:16
 "I Hear Music" (Burton Lane, Frank Loesser) - 3:30
 "Royal Garden Blues" (Clarence Williams, Spencer Williams) - 3:54
 "A Sinner Kisses an Angel" (Mack David, Richard M. Jones, Ray Joseph) – 3:16
 "It Had to Be You" (Isham Jones, Gus Kahn) - 3:13

Personnel 
Bud Shank - alto saxophone, tenor saxophone, baritone saxophone, alto flute, flute
Shorty Rogers - flugelhorn (tracks 1-6)
Bill Perkins - alto saxophone, tenor saxophone, flute (tracks 7-12)
Jimmy Rowles (tracks 1-6), Hampton Hawes (tracks 7-12) - piano
Harry Babasin (tracks 1-6), Red Mitchell (tracks 7-12) - bass
Roy Harte (tracks 1-6), Mel Lewis (tracks 7-12) - drums

References 

1955 albums
Pacific Jazz Records albums
Bud Shank albums
Shorty Rogers albums
Bill Perkins (saxophonist) albums